Sahajanwa is a constituency of the Uttar Pradesh Legislative Assembly covering the city of Sahajanwa in the Gorakhpur district of Uttar Pradesh, India. It is one of five assembly constituencies in the Gorakhpur Lok Sabha constituency. Since 2008, this assembly constituency is numbered 324 amongst 403 constituencies.

Members of the Legislative Assembly

Election results

2022

2017
Bharatiya Janta Party candidate Sheetal Pandey won in the 2017 Uttar Pradesh Legislative Assembly election defeating Samajwadi Party candidate Yaspal Singh Rawat by a margin of 15,377 votes.

References

External links
 

Assembly constituencies of Uttar Pradesh
Politics of Gorakhpur district